White Shoes is a studio album by Emmylou Harris, released in 1983. The album includes a rockish version of "Diamonds Are a Girl's Best Friend", a country remake of the Donna Summer hit "On the Radio", and a version of Sandy Denny's "Like an Old Fashioned Waltz". Both "In My Dreams" and "Pledging My Love" hit the #9 position on the Billboard country music singles chart in 1984.

Production
White Shoes was produced by Brian Ahern, and was the final album that Harris would record with him.

Critical reception
The Philadelphia Inquirer wrote that "there's a hoarse, quavery quality in Harris' voice that's a welcome relief from the crisp, crystalline warbling that's long been her trademark."

Track listing

Personnel
Emmylou Harris – vocals, acoustic guitar, backing vocals
Brian Ahern – acoustic guitar, electric guitar, bass, 6-string bass, percussion, tambourine
Barbara Bennett – backing vocals
Mike Bowden – bass
Bonnie Bramlett – backing vocals
Tony Brown – piano, electric piano
T Bone Burnett – acoustic guitar, electric guitar, percussion, backing vocals
Rodney Crowell – acoustic guitar
Hank DeVito – steel guitar
Shirley Eikhard – backing vocals
Steve Fishell – steel guitar, Melobar
Wayne Goodwin – baritone saxophone
Glen D. Hardin – electric piano, string arrangements
Don Heffington – drums
Jim Horn – recorders
Don Johnson – piano, electric piano, backing vocals
Keith Knudsen – drums
John McFee – acoustic guitar, electric guitar
Bill Payne – piano, electric piano, keyboards, synthesizer
Mickey Raphael – harmonica
Frank Reckard – electric guitar
Barry Tashian – acoustic guitar, backing vocals
John Ware – drums

Technical personnel
Brian Ahern – producer, engineer
Donivan Cowart – engineer
Stuart Taylor – engineer
Alan Vachon – engineer

Charts

Weekly charts

Year-end charts

References

Emmylou Harris albums
1983 albums
Albums produced by Brian Ahern (producer)
Warner Records albums